Hyde Park After Dark is an album by saxophonist Clifford Jordan which was recorded in Chicago in 1981 together with Victor Sproles on bass, Wilbur Campbell on drums, Norman Simmons on piano, Cy Touff on bass trumpet, and Von Freeman on saxophone. The album is a tribute to the Chicago jazz scene and a reunion of important players from the 1950s.

Track listing

Personnel
Band
Victor Sproles – bass 
Wilbur Campbell – drums 
Norman Simmons – piano 
Cy Touff – bass trumpet
Von Freeman – tenor saxophone
Clifford Jordan – tenor saxophone

Production
Malcolm Addey – engineer 
Hank Hechtman – cover
Norman Simmons – arranging 
Dick Sorensen – layout
Chris Erbach – photography
Jim Neumann – producer
Susan Neumann – producer
Paul Serrano – recording

References

Clifford Jordan albums
1984 albums
Bee Hive Records albums